Jorge Cardiel (born 23 April 1924) was a Mexican basketball player. He competed in the men's tournament at the 1948 Summer Olympics and the 1952 Summer Olympics.

References

External links

1924 births
Possibly living people
Mexican men's basketball players
Olympic basketball players of Mexico
Basketball players at the 1948 Summer Olympics
Basketball players at the 1952 Summer Olympics